Lost Masterpieces of Pornography is a 2010 short film written and directed by David Mamet and starring Kristen Bell, Ed O'Neill and Ricky Jay. It was produced for Funny or Die.

References

External links
 Lost Masterpieces of Pornography
 

2010 films
2010 comedy films
2010 short films
American comedy short films
Films about films
Films about pornography
Films directed by David Mamet
Films with screenplays by David Mamet
Funny or Die
2010s English-language films
2010s American films